Eucereon casca is a moth of the subfamily Arctiinae. It was described by Paul Dognin in 1894. It is found in Ecuador and Bolivia.

References

 Natural History Museum Lepidoptera generic names catalog

casca
Moths described in 1894